= Shuravil =

- Location in Iran
- Coordinates: 38°13′59″N 48°17′00″E
- Country: Iran
- Province: Ardabil Province
- Time zone: UTC+3:30 (IRST)
  - Summer (DST): UTC+4:30 (IRDT)

Shuravil is a village in the Ardabil Province of Iran.
